Onurcan Güler (born 24 March 1995) is a Turkish professional footballer who plays as a midfielder for Uşakspor.

Professional career
Onurcan made his professional debut for Akhisarspor in a 2-1 Turkish Cup loss to Galatasaray on 17 December 2015. Onurcan spent most of his early career on loan in the TFF First League and TFF Second League with successive stints at Menemen Belediyespor, BB Bodrumspor, Muğlaspor, Selçukspor, Afjet Afyonspor, and Zonguldak Kömürspor.

Honours
Akhisarspor
 Turkish Super Cup: 2018

References

External links
 
 
 

1995 births
People from Kelkit
Living people
Turkish footballers
Association football midfielders
Akhisarspor footballers
Menemenspor footballers
Muğlaspor footballers
1922 Konyaspor footballers
Utaş Uşakspor footballers
Süper Lig players
TFF First League players
TFF Second League players
TFF Third League players